Lepidochrysops heathi is a butterfly in the family Lycaenidae. It is found in Zambia. Adults feed from flowers, including Ocimum species. They have been recorded in October.

References

Butterflies described in 1998
Lepidochrysops
Endemic fauna of Zambia
Butterflies of Africa